Harold Fisch (25 March 1923, Birmingham – 8 November 2001, Jerusalem), also known as Aharon Harel-Fisch, was a British-Israeli author, literary critic, translator, and diplomat. He was a Professor of English and Comparative literature at Bar-Ilan University, of which he served as Rector from 1968 to 1971. He was awarded the Israel Prize for Literature in 2000.

Biography
Harold (Aharon) Fisch was born in Birmingham to Rebecca (née Swift) and Rabbi Dr. Solomon Fisch. His mother was the sister of Rabbi Morris Swift, who was a dayan of the London Beth Din for nearly two decades. Fisch's father, born in Wolbrom, Poland, studied at Rabbi Solomon Breuer's yeshiva in Frankfurt before emigrating to England in 1920, where he received a doctorate from the University of Manchester. As a child, Fisch moved between Liverpool, Birmingham, Sheffield, and Leeds, where his father took up posts as a congregational rabbi.

Fisch began his undergraduate degree in English literature at the University of Sheffield in 1940, at the age of 17. His studies were interrupted by his service in the Royal Naval Volunteer Reserve from 1942 to 1945, as an officer on the HMS Meynell and the HMS Kildary. He completed his B.A. in 1946, and was appointed Lecturer in English at the University of Leeds the following year, meanwhile serving as chairman of the Inter-University Jewish Federation. In 1948, he received his BLitt from the University of Oxford, with a thesis on Calvinist bishop Joseph Hall.

Academic career
In 1957, Fisch immigrated to Israel with his wife and four children, and accepted an associate professorship in English literature at the newly founded Bar-Ilan University. He was appointed full professor in 1964, and held the position of Rector from 1968 to 1971. Fisch founded the Kotler Institute for Judaism and Contemporary Thought in 1971, and the Lechter Institute for Literary Research in 1981, of which he served as chairman until his retirement from Bar-Ilan in 1987.

Fisch was responsible for the English translation of the Tanakh for the Koren Jerusalem Bible (1964), based on Michael Friedländer's Jewish Family Bible, which is still in publication and on its third edition.

Zionist activism
Fisch participated in the establishment of the Neo-Zionist Movement for Greater Israel after the Six-Day War. His 1972 work A Zionist Revolution included a defense of Gush Emunim, based on the ideas of Menachem Kasher and Abraham Isaac Kook. During the era of Prime Minister Menachem Begin, Fisch was a member of the Israeli delegation to the 32nd General Assembly of the United Nations. He declined an offer from the Prime Minister to occupy the position of Ambassador of Israel to the Netherlands.

Awards and recognition
Fisch was awarded the Israel Prize for Literature in 2000. He died on 8 November 2001 of a tumor discovered two weeks earlier.

Published works

References

1923 births
2001 deaths
Academics of the University of Leeds
Alumni of the University of Oxford
Alumni of the University of Sheffield
Academic staff of Bar-Ilan University
British academics of English literature
British emigrants to Israel
British Jewish writers
British people of Polish-Jewish descent
British Zionists
Burials at Har HaMenuchot
English literary critics
Israel Prize in literature recipients
Israeli literary critics
Israeli officials of the United Nations
Israeli people of British-Jewish descent
Israeli people of Polish-Jewish descent
Jewish translators of the Bible
Neo-Zionism
Military personnel from Birmingham, West Midlands
Political philosophers
Presidents of universities in Israel
Royal Navy officers of World War II
Translators of the Bible into English
Writers from Birmingham, West Midlands
20th-century translators